Mako Sajko (19 January 1927 – 1 January 2023) was a Slovenian documentarist, screenwriter and film director.

Life and career 
Born in Tržič, Sajko studied direction under Slavko Vorkapić at the High Film School in Belgrade, graduating in 1959 and becoming the first Slovenian film director with a formal degree in directing. 

A socially committed filmmaker who had a peculiar interest to taboo themes such as industrial pollution or prostitution, he is best known for the documentary film Samomorilci, pozor! ("Suicides, Beware!", 1967), which in spite of getting several awards and critical acclaim enraged Yugoslav authorities because of the unwanted attention it placed on the numerous suicides among young people; the controversy resulted in the establishment of the first youth suicide prevention programmes but also in the banning of the film and in Sajko having reduced career opportunities such as being denied a feature film debut, and after the ban of his last documentary film (Narodna noša, "National Costume", 1975) he was forced to a premature retirement from cinema.

He died on 1 January 2023, at the age of 95.

References

External links 
 
 

1927 births
2023 deaths
Slovenian screenwriters
Slovenian film directors
Documentary film directors 
People from Tržič